Kent Patterson (born September 15, 1989) is an American former professional ice hockey goaltender. He was drafted by the Colorado Avalanche in the 2007 NHL Entry Draft and played in the American Hockey League (AHL) for the Lake Erie Monsters.

Playing career
Patterson played high school hockey in his native Minnesota with The Blake School before crossing to minor junior hockey with the Cedar Rapids RoughRiders in the United States Hockey League. After an impressive season culminating in a selection to the USHL All-Rookie team, Patterson was drafted by the Colorado Avalanche in the 4th round (113th overall) of the 2007 NHL Entry Draft.

Committing to the University of Minnesota to play with the Golden Gophers in the Western Collegiate Hockey Association conference, Patterson assumed the backup position to Alex Kangas for his freshman and sophomore seasons. In his junior season in 2010–11, Patterson emerged as the starting goaltender for the Golden Gophers and in 30 appearances accumulated 14 victories to be named in the All-WCHA Second Team. As a senior in 2011–12, Patterson compiled his most successful collegiate season, earning a career high 28 wins in 43 games for the Gophers. Patterson was subsequently awarded the WCHA Goaltending Champion award as the goalie with the lowest goals against average of 2.06 and a starting place in the All-WCHA First Team.

On May 11, 2012, Patterson signed his first professional contract by signing to a two-year entry level deal with the Avalanche. After initially attending American Hockey League affiliate, the Lake Erie Monsters training camp, Patterson was reassigned to make his pro debut to start the 2012–13 season with the Denver Cutthroats of the CHL, a secondary affiliate of the Avalanche. Patterson started in the Cutthroats inaugural game and recorded his first professional win over the Missouri Mavericks on October 19, 2012. Patterson's impressive play behind the Cutthroats defense was rewarded when he was selected as the CHL's Goaltender and Rookie of the Month award for November. On January 31, he was recalled to serve as a backup for Monsters of the AHL. In his American League debut, Patterson recorded a shutout in a 1–0 shoot-out loss to the Abbotsford Heat on February 10, 2013. After four games with the Monsters, Patterson was returned to the Cutthroats and remained for the duration of their campaign. At the conclusion of the Cutthroats opening round playoff loss, Patterson was recalled to the Monsters and notched his first AHL win with a victory over the Syracuse Crunch on April 9, 2013.

At the conclusion of his entry-level contract, and having spent the majority of his tenure with secondary affiliate, the Denver Cutthroats, Patterson was not tendered a new contract by the Avalanche in releasing him to free agency. On August 4, 2014, he was signed to a one-year contract with ECHL club, the Orlando Solar Bears. On January 16, 2015 he was traded by Orlando to the Gwinnett Gladiators. He assumed starting goaltender status with Gwinnett, posting just 4 wins in 20 games.

After spending the 2015–16 season, sharing starting duties with the renamed Atlanta Gladiators, Patterson was signed for the following 2016–17 season, with fellow ECHL club, the Rapid City Rush, on October 3, 2016. Patterson earned 2 wins in 8 games with the Rush before he was released from his contract on November 8, 2016. He was immediately picked up by the Quad City Mallards but was later released on November 17, without having made an appearance with the club.

Patterson ended his 6-year professional career following the 2017–18 season, opting to move into coaching in accepting a goaltending coach role with junior club, the Waterloo Black Hawks of the USHL.

Career statistics

Awards and honors

References

External links 

1989 births
Living people
American men's ice hockey goaltenders
Atlanta Gladiators players
Cedar Rapids RoughRiders players
Colorado Avalanche draft picks
Denver Cutthroats players
Gwinnett Gladiators players
Ice hockey players from Minnesota
Kansas City Mavericks players
Lake Erie Monsters players
Minnesota Golden Gophers men's ice hockey players
Orlando Solar Bears (ECHL) players
Pensacola Ice Flyers players
People from Plymouth, Minnesota
Rapid City Rush players
Wichita Thunder players
AHCA Division I men's ice hockey All-Americans